The 1969–70 season of the Moroccan Throne Cup was the 14th edition of the competition.

Wydad Athletic Club won the cup, beating Renaissance de Settat 1–0 in the final, played at the Stade d'honneur in Casablanca. Wydad Athletic Club won the cup for the first time in their history.

Competition

Last 16

Quarter-finals

Semi-finals

Final 
The final was played between the two winning semi-finalists, Wydad Athletic Club and Renaissance de Settat, on 12 July 1970 at the Stade d'honneur in Casablanca.

Notes and references 

1969
1969 in association football
1970 in association football
1969–70 in Moroccan football